San Nicolás de Bari Municipal Museum is a museum located in 32nd street in San Nicolás de Bari, Cuba. It was established on 28 January 1982.

The museum holds collections on history, weaponry and ethnology.

See also 
 List of museums in Cuba

References 

Museums in Cuba
Buildings and structures in Mayabeque Province
Museums established in 1982
1982 establishments in Cuba
20th-century architecture in Cuba